Turpin was a 12th-century bishop of Brechin. Turpin has come to the court of king William the Lion as early as 1170, when his name begins to appear in the charters of king William. He was elected to the see of Brechin in 1178, probably with the backing of king William, and consecrated in 1180. He is the first of the non-Gaelic bishops of Brechin. His death date is not known, but it was certainly before the year 1198. He was succeeded by another Norman called Radulphus.

References
Dowden, John, The Bishops of Scotland, ed. J. Maitland Thomson, (Glasgow, 1912)

12th-century births
1190s deaths
Bishops of Brechin (pre-Reformation)
12th-century Scottish bishops